Into the Abyss may refer to:

 Into the Abyss (book), a 2012 non-fiction book by Carol Shaben
 Into the Abyss (film), a 2011 documentary by Werner Herzog
 Into the Abyss (album), a 2000 album by Hypocrisy
 "Into the Abyss" (song), a 1982 song by Sex Gang Children
 Into the Abyss, an upcoming game based on season 2 of Guardians Evolution
 "Into the Abyss", an episode of the 2008 BBC series Pacific Abyss

See also
 Abyss (disambiguation)
 "In the Abyss", an 1896 short story by H. G. Wells
 "Made in Abyss", a 2012 til present manga by Akihito Tsukushi about entering into an abyss